BBC Radio One Live in Concert is a 1991 live album of a 1972 concert by Hawkwind.

"It was recorded straight to quarter-inch tape – there were no overdubs and no possibility of remixing. This particular performance was also continuous for one hour which made for an interesting change over when the programme was aired since the reels of tape only lasted approximately 30 minutes each." – Jeff Griffin, BBC in Concert series producer.

This concert is still regularly aired by BBC Radio on the Live at Midnight slot on the BBC 6 Music channel . Despite Griffin's claims that remixing is not possible, the broadcast version does sound markedly different from the CD release, having greater clarity and definition on the instruments and vocals. The broadcast version also has some brutal edits, removing the first 4 minutes of "Brainstorm", and during "Earth Calling" and the end credits.

In March 2010, EMI re-issued the concert as Hawkwind: At the BBC – 1972 as a double CD; the first CD containing the original Windsong version, the second CD containing the version BBC uses for broadcast. The first CD also includes the studio session recorded for the Johnnie Walker show in August 1972, with performances of "Silver Machine" and "Brainstorm".

Track listing

BBC Radio 1 Live in Concert 
 "Countdown" [unlisted] (Dunkley) – 1:00"Born To Go" (Calvert/Brock) – 11:15"Black Corridor" [unlisted] (Moorcock) – 2:30
 "Seven By Seven" (Brock) – 7:05
 "Brainstorm" (Turner) – 10:38
 "Electronic No 1" [unlisted] (Dik Mik/Dettmar) – 2:30"Master of the Universe" (Turner/Brock) – 7:22
 "Paranoia" (Hawkwind) – 5:55"Earth Calling" [unlisted] (Calvert) – 3:29
 "Silver Machine" (Calvert/Brock) – 4:45"Welcome to the Future" [unlisted] (Calvert) – – 3:03"Credits" [unlisted] (Dunkley)

At the BBC 1972 Disk 1: Mono 
 "Brainstorm" [Johnnie Walker Radio 1 Session] – 5:28
 "Silver Machine" [Johnnie Walker Radio 1 Session] – 3:50
 "Countdown" – 0:55
 "Born To Go" – 11:23
 "The Black Corridor" – 2:23
 "Seven By Seven" – 7:05
 "Brainstorm" – 10:15
 "Electronic No. 1" – 2:41
 "Master of the Universe" – 7:28
 "Paranoia" – 5:55
 "Earth Calling" – 3:02
 "Silver Machine" – 5:09
 "Welcome to the Future" – 3:10

At the BBC 1972 Disc 2: Stereo 
 "Countdown" – 1:08
 "Born To Go" – 11:19
 "The Black Corridor" – 2:25
 "Seven By Seven" – 7:06
 "Brainstorm" – 6:12
 "Electronic No. 1" – 2:03
 "Master of the Universe" – 7:29
 "Paranoia" – 5:55
 "Earth Calling" – 3:02
 "Silver Machine" – 5:10
 "Welcome to the Future" – 2:52

Personnel 
 Dave Brock – guitar, vocals
 Nik Turner – saxophone, flute, vocals
 Lemmy – bass guitar, vocals
 Dik Mik Davies – Synthesizer
 Del Dettmar – Synthesizer
 Simon King – drums
 Stacia – Announcements
 Andy Dunkley – Announcements

Credits 
 Recorded: 28 September 1972, Paris Theatre, London
 Broadcast: 14 October 1972, BBC Radio 1 In Concert
 Producer: Jeff Griffin
 Engineer: Chris Lycett

Release history 
 October 1991: Windsong, WINCD007, UK
 September 1991: Genschman, GENSCH1002, Germany – titled Space Rock From London (broadcast version)
 December 1994: Live Storm, LSCD51626, Italy – titled Space London 1972 (broadcast version)
 15 March 2010: EMI, HAWKS7, UK

References

External links
 Starfarer – review and comparisons of the two different releases.

BBC Radio recordings
Hawkwind live albums
1991 live albums